CKLJ-FM is a Canadian radio station that broadcasts a country format at 96.5 FM in Olds, Alberta. The station is branded as 96.5 CK-FM and is owned by CAB-K Broadcasting Ltd.

History
The station originally began broadcasting on February 2, 2004 at 97.7 FM, until it moved to its current frequency in 2007.

References

External links
96.5 CK-FM
 
 

Klj
Klj
Radio stations established in 2004
2004 establishments in Alberta